Paynesville is an unincorporated community in Saluda Township, Jefferson County, Indiana.

History
Paynesville was named in honor of Miller Payne, a pioneer.

Paynesville was hit by a tornado on March 2, 2012, and one person died. Three fatalities occurred about a mile away in Chelsea.

Geography 

See also 
Tornado outbreak of March 2–3, 2012

References 

Unincorporated communities in Jefferson County, Indiana
Unincorporated communities in Indiana